Duncan Robert Yorke Bluck, CBE (19 March 1927 – 6 October 2015) was a British businessman. He was the managing director of the Cathay Pacific Airways from 1971 to 1979.

References

1927 births
2015 deaths
People educated at Taunton School
British expatriates in Hong Kong
Hong Kong chief executives
British airline chief executives
Cathay Pacific
Swire Group
HSBC people
Commanders of the Order of the British Empire
20th-century British businesspeople